Alfredo Intriago Ortega (born 4 December 1970) is an Ecuadorian international referee who refereed at the 2010 and 2014 FIFA World Cup qualifiers.

Notes

References

External links 
 
 
 

1970 births
Living people
Ecuadorian football referees